Group D of the 2014 FIBA Basketball World Cup was the group stage of the 2014 FIBA Basketball World Cup for , , , ,  and . Each team played each other once, for a total of five games per team, with all of the games played at Gran Canaria Arena, Las Palmas, located in the island of Gran Canaria, Canary Islands. After all of the games were played, the four teams with the best records qualified for the final round.

Teams

Standings

All times are local UTC+1.

30 August

Angola vs. Korea
This was the third meeting between Angola and South Korea in the World Cup. The teams have split their two previous match-ups with Korea winning in 1994 and Angola winning in the 1990 FIBA World Championship. The last competitive game between the two was an Angola win at the 1996 Olympics.

Australia vs. Slovenia
This was the second meeting between Australia and Slovenia in the World Cup. Slovenia won their first match-up during the 2010 FIBA World Championship.

Mexico vs. Lithuania
This was the first meeting between Mexico and Lithuania.

31 August

Korea vs. Australia
This was the third meeting between Australia and South Korea in the World Cup. Australia won in the 1994 FIBA World Championship, while the South Koreans won in 1970. The last competitive meeting between the two was at the 1996 Olympics where the Australians won.

Slovenia vs. Mexico
This was the first meeting between Slovenia and Mexico.

Lithuania vs. Angola
This was the first meeting between Lithuania and Angola in the World Cup. The Lithuanians have won both of their games against Angola in the 1996 and 2004 Olympics.

2 September

Angola vs. Mexico
This was the first competitive game between Angola and Mexico.

Australia vs. Lithuania
This was the second meeting between Australia and Lithuania in the World Cup. Lithuania won in the 2010 FIBA World Championship, while the Australians won in 1998. Australia won at the 2008 Olympics, its last competitive game against Lithuania.

Korea vs. Slovenia
This was the first competitive game between South Korea and Slovenia.

3 September

Mexico vs. Australia
This was the second meeting between Mexico and Australia in the World Cup. Mexico won the first match-up during the 1974 FIBA World Championship. The Australians also won both of their games against Mexico at the Olympics, in 1964 and 1976.

Slovenia vs. Angola
This was the first competitive game between Slovenia and Angola.

Lithuania vs. Korea
This was the second competitive game between Lithuania and South Korea. Lithuania previously won at the 1998 FIBA World Championship.

4 September

Australia vs. Angola
This was the third meeting between Australia and Angola in the World Cup. The Australians won in the 2010 FIBA World Championship, while Angola won in 1986.

Korea vs. Mexico
This was the first meeting between South Korea and Mexico in the World Cup. The Mexicans have previously defeated South Korea in the 1948 and 1968 Olympics.

Lithuania vs. Slovenia
This was the first meeting between Lithuania and Slovenia in the World Cup. Lithuania had previously won against Slovenia five times in seven games at the EuroBasket, with the last win coming at 2011.

External links
 
 

Group D
Group D
2014–15 in Slovenian basketball
2014–15 in Australian basketball
2014 in Mexican sports
2014–15 in Angolan basketball
2014–15 in South Korean basketball